Jonatan Oliveira is a Brazilian kickboxer. As of March 2022, he was the #9 ranked middleweight kickboxer in the world by Combat Press.

Kickboxing career
Oliveira made his Glory debut against Nicola Gallo at Glory 5: London on March 23, 2013. He won the fight by unanimous decision. Oliveira made his second Glory appearance against Atakan Arslan at Glory 15: Istanbul on April 14, 2014. He won the fight by a third-round technical knockout.

Oliveira was booked to face Raymond Daniels at Glory 19: Virginia on February 6, 2015, in the semifinals of the Glory welterweight contender tournament. He lost the fight by a second-round technical knockout. Oliveira next participated in the Kunlun Fight tournament held at Kunlun Fight 23 on April 26, 2015. He lost the fight by a third-round knockout.

Oliveira faced Yohan Lidon at Fight Night Saint-Tropez on August 4, 2015. He lost the fight by a third-round technical knockout.

Oliveira returned to Glory to face Meran Zangana at Glory 29: Copenhagen on April 16, 2016. He lost the fight by a third-round technical knockout. Oliveria's losing streak extended at Kunlun Fight 45 on June 5, 2016, as he dropped a unanimous decision against Artur Kyshenko. Oliveira participated in the 2016 Kunlun Fight welterweight tournament as well, and faced Murthel Groenhart in the tournament quarterfinals at Kunlun Fight 50 on August 20, 2016. He lost the fight by a second-round technical knockout.

Oliveira made his ACB debut against Alexander Stetsurenko at ACB KB 15: Grand Prix Kitek on April 20, 2018. He won the fight by unanimous decision. Oliveira was next booked to face Vitaliy Gurkov at ACB-KB 17 on August 5, 2018. He won the fight by a second-round technical knockout.

Oliveira took part in the Fair Fight welterweight tournament, which took place at Fair Fight VII on February 2, 2019. He was able to beat Alexander Sanochkin by split decision, after an extra round was fought, in the semifinals, but lost the final bout against Sher Mamazulunov by decision in turn.

Fight record

|-  style="background:#cfc"
| 2021-12-13 || Win ||align=left| Alexander Stetsurenko || Tatneft Cup, -80kg Final || Russia || Ext.R Decision || 4 || 3:00
|-
! style=background:white colspan=9 |
|-
|-  style="background:#cfc"
| 2021-12-13|| Win ||align=left| Maksim Zaplitniy || Tatneft Cup, -80kg Semifinal || Russia || TKO (Retirement) || 2 || 3:00
|-
|-  style="background:#cfc"
| 2021-10-26 || Win ||align=left| Mohammad Amraliev || Tatneft Cup, -80kg Quarterfinal || Russia || Ext.R Decision || 4 || 3:00
|-
|-  style="background:#fbb"
| 2019-10-26 || Loss ||align=left| Surik Magakian || Fair Fight X || Yekaterinburg, Russia || Ext. R. Dec || 4 || 3:00
|-
|-  style="background:#fbb"
| 2019-02-09 || Loss ||align=left| Sher Mamazulunov || Fair Fight VII, Tournament Final || Yekaterinburg, Russia || Ext. R. Dec || 4 || 3:00
|-
! style=background:white colspan=9 |
|-
|-  style="background:#cfc"
| 2019-02-09 || Win ||align=left| Alexander Sanochkin || Fair Fight VII, Tournament Semifinal || Yekaterinburg, Russia || Ext. R. Dec (Split) || 4 || 3:00
|-
|-  style="background:#cfc"
| 2018-08-05 || Win ||align=left| Vitaly Gurkov || ACB-KB 17 || Pskov, Russia || TKO (Referee stoppage) || 2 || 0:34
|-
|-  style="background:#fbb"
| 2018-04-20 || Loss||align=left| Alexander Stetsurenko || ACB KB 15: Grand Prix Kitek || Moscow, Russia || Decision (Unanimous) || 3 || 3:00
|-
|-  style="background:#fbb"
| 2016-08-20|| Loss ||align=left| Murthel Groenhart ||  Kunlun Fight 50, Tournament Quarterfinal || Jinan, China || TKO  || 2 || 
|-
|-  style="background:#fbb"
| 2016-06-05 || Loss ||align=left| Artur Kyshenko ||  Kunlun Fight 45 || Chengdu, China || Decision (Unanimous) || 3 || 3:00
|-
|-  style="background:#fbb"
| 2016-04-16|| Loss ||align=left| Meran Zangana ||  Glory 29: Copenhagen || Copenhagen, Denmark || TKO (Three knockdowns) || 3 || 0:17
|-
|-  style="background:#fbb"
| 2015-08-04 || Loss ||align=left| Yohan Lidon ||  Fight Night Saint-Tropez || Saint Tropez, France || TKO || 3 || 
|-
|-  style="background:#fbb"
| 2015-04-26 || Loss ||align=left| Artur Kyshenko ||  Kunlun Fight 23, Tournament Quarterfinals || Changsha, China || KO || 3 || 
|-
|-  style="background:#fbb"
| 2015-02-06 || Loss ||align=left| Raymond Daniels ||  Glory 19: Virginia, Tournament Semifinals || Hampton, Virginia, United States || TKO (referee stoppage) || 2|| 2:15
|-
|-  style="background:#cfc"
| 2014-04-14 || Win ||align=left| Atakan Arslan || Glory 15: Istanbul || Istanbul, Turkey || TKO (referee stoppage) || 2|| 3:00
|-
|-  style="background:#cfc"
| 2013-03-23 || Win ||align=left| Nicola Gallo || Glory 5: London || London, England || Decision (Unanimous) || 3 || 3:00
|-
|-  style="background:#cfc"
| 2011-06-01 || Win ||align=left| Fred Couto || || Brazil || TKO (Knees) || 1 || 
|-
|-  style="background:#fbb"
| 2011 || Loss ||align=left| André Dedé || Samurai Fight Combat 5 || Curitiba, Brazil || Decision || 3 || 3:00
|-
|-
| colspan=9 | Legend:

Professional boxing record

See also
 List of male kickboxers

References

Living people
1990 births
Brazilian male kickboxers
Sportspeople from Curitiba